Eduardo "Eddy" Gesualdo (born November 28, 1968) was a midfielder who played for the Winnipeg Fury.

Playing career
Eddy played with the Winnipeg Fury, from 1990 to 1992. In 1992, he asked for his release from the club, after their 5-2 victory against Montreal Supra at Winnipeg Stadium, following a decrease in his playing time. He had made 14 total appearances during the 1990 and 1991 seasons, but had not made any appearances in 1992.

He has also been noted to play with the Sons of Italy Lions, Ital-Inter, Lucania and AC Italia in Winnipeg.
In 2008, the 1992 Canadian Soccer League Champion Winnipeg Fury were inducted into the Manitoba Sports Hall of Fame, with members of the team re-uniting to play against local team AC Italia, which was Gesualdo's current team, resulting in him playing against his former teammates..

References 

1968 births
Living people
Canadian soccer players
Winnipeg Fury players
Canadian Soccer League (1987–1992) players
Association footballers not categorized by position